Amy Globus is an American artist, designer, and entrepreneur. She is the co-founder and creative director of the brand design studio, Team.

Globus has exhibited her work at the Whitney Museum of American Art, The New Museum and the MIT List Visual Arts Center. Prior to co-founding Team, she developed brand identities and interactive work for Lexus, Vodafone, and Red Bull.

Early life and education 
Amy Globus was born to Marie and Rudo Steven Globus in America. She holds a Bachelor of Arts in Philosophy from Brown University, BFA in Printmaking from the Rhode Island School of Design, and an MFA in New Genres from Columbia University in New York City.

Career 
Globus started her career in 2002, working for Kirshenbaum Bond & Partners (now kbs+) as a Senior Designer. In 2007, she joined Skinny (ViTRO) as Design Director/Concept Architect before moving to K&Co. in the same position.

In 2015 she co-founded her own company, Team. Her work has been featured at the Whitney Museum of American Art, The New Museum, The D'Amelio Gallery, Nevada Museum of Art, the RISD Museum in Providence, RI, the Bibliotheque Thiers, Paris, France, and at the Liverpool Biennial, United Kingdom.

In August 2005, she had a solo exhibition at the Museo Nacional Centro de Arte Reina Sofía

Globus was the recipient of the Rema Hort Mann Foundation 2002 ghank rant alongside other artists. She has been featured in in the New York Times, and Architectural Digest, and Fast Company.    

In 2021, Globus' company, Team was listed as an honoree in Fast Company's Innovation by Design Awards. Team's rebrand for the pharmaceutical and biotechnology corporation, Pfizer, was featured in the awards' "Best Branding of 2021" category.

References

External links
 Fast Company: Covid-19 devastated arts organizations. But it was also a wake-up call they desperately needed
 Architectural Digest
 NY Times
 Artsy: According to Amy Globus
 Whitewall: Three Artists to Watch

Living people
Year of birth missing (living people)
21st-century American women artists
21st-century American businesswomen
21st-century American businesspeople
Brown University alumni
Rhode Island School of Design alumni
Columbia University School of the Arts alumni